Wadesville is an unincorporated community in northern Center Township, Posey County, in the U.S. state of Indiana.  It lies along State Road 66 northeast of the city of Mt. Vernon, the county seat of Posey County.  Its elevation is 479 feet (146 m).  Although Wadesville is unincorporated, it has a post office, with the ZIP code of 47638.

History
Wadesville was laid out in 1852. The community was named for the Wade family of settlers. A post office has been in operation at Wadesville since 1855.

Wadesville High School
Wadesville had a local high school, the "Wadesville Red Devils." In 1958 Wadesville consolidated with Poseyville, Cynthiana, and Griffin to form North Posey High School. The school's yearbook was called the "Devilree." The school offered grades 1st-12th.

Red Devil Athletics
The school colors of the Red Devils were white and red. Wadesville competed in the Posey County Conference until 1958. In the final season for the Red Devils basketball team they went 11-9 and won the Posey County Conference tournament, defeating Cynthiana 81–59 in the final. The Red Devils also won the Posey County Conference in the 1958 baseball season.

Education
Wadesville is within the Metropolitan School District of North Posey County. MSD of North Posey County consists of two elementary schools (North, South Terrace), North Posey Junior High School, and North Posey High School.

Highways
  Indiana State Road 66
  Indiana State Road 165

References

Unincorporated communities in Posey County, Indiana
Unincorporated communities in Indiana